Sporting Pizarro is a Peruvian football club, playing in the city of Tumbes, Peru.

History 
Sporting Pizarro is a traditional team of Tumbes. In the 2001 Copa Perú and 2003 Copa Perú, the team was eliminated by Atlético Grau of Piura in the Regional Stage. In the 2005 Copa Perú, Sporting Pizarro was eliminated by Boca Juniors of Ferreñafe in the Regional Stage. 

In the 2007 Copa Perú, the club classified to the National Stage but was eliminated by Sport Vallejo of Trujillo in the quarterfinals. 

Sporting Pizarro won the 2010 Liga Superior de Tumbes, when defeated Deportivo Pacífico of Zarumilla.

In the 2011 Torneo Intermedio, the club was eliminated by Sport Huancayo in the Round of 16.

Honours

Regional
Región I: 1
 Winners (1): 2012
Runner-up (1): 2007

Liga Departamental de Tumbes: 4
 Winners (4): 2001, 2003, 2005, 2012

Liga Superior de Tumbes: 2
 Winners (2): 2010, 2012
 Runner-up (1): 2014

References

See also
List of football clubs in Peru
Peruvian football league system

 

Football clubs in Peru